Fearing Township is one of the twenty-two townships of Washington County, Ohio, United States.  The 2000 census found 910 people in the township.

Geography
Located in the central part of the county, it borders the following townships:
Salem Township - north
Liberty Township - northeast corner
Lawrence Township - east
Newport Township - southeast corner
Marietta Township - south
Muskingum Township - west

A small portion of the county seat of Marietta is located in southwestern Fearing Township.

Name and history
Fearing Township was established in 1808, and named for Paul Fearing, an early settler. It is the only Fearing Township statewide.

Government
The township is governed by a three-member board of trustees, who are elected in November of odd-numbered years to a four-year term beginning on the following January 1. Two are elected in the year after the presidential election and one is elected in the year before it. There is also an elected township fiscal officer, who serves a four-year term beginning on April 1 of the year after the election, which is held in November of the year before the presidential election. Vacancies in the fiscal officership or on the board of trustees are filled by the remaining trustees.

References

External links
County website

Townships in Washington County, Ohio
Townships in Ohio